Uetikon is a railway station in the Swiss canton of Zurich, on the Lake Zurich right bank railway line. The station takes its name from the municipality of Uetikon am See, and is located on the border of that municipality and the adjoining municipality of Männedorf.

The station is served by the following passenger trains:

References

External links 

Uetikon station on Swiss Federal Railway's web site

Railway stations in the canton of Zürich
Swiss Federal Railways stations